Muhammad Zulfahmi Khairuddin (born 20 October 1991) is a Malaysian motorcycle racer.

Career

125cc World Championship
Born in Banting, Selangor, Malaysia, Zulfahmi made his debut in the 125cc world championship at the 2009 Malaysian Grand Prix where he finished 20th. In 2010, Zulfahmi competed in his first full season on board an Aprilia for the Air Asia-Sepang International Circuit.

Moto3 World Championship
Zulfahmi achieved his first pole position by a Malaysian rider in any class at his home race in October 2012. Zulfahmi led for most of the race, but finished second behind team-mate Sandro Cortese, after Cortese made a final-lap pass. At the end of the 2012 MotoGP campaign at Valencia, he claimed the 2nd podium of his career; he climbed from 17th on the grid to finish 3rd behind Danny Kent and Sandro Cortese in a dramatic thrilling race.

Moto2 World Championship
He briefly returned to Grand Prix racing but after a poor start to the 2018 season he decided to retire from racing.

Career statistics

Grand Prix motorcycle racing

By season

By class

Races by year
(key) (Races in bold indicate pole position; races in italics indicate fastest lap)

Supersport World Championship

Races by year
(key) (Races in bold indicate pole position; races in italics indicate fastest lap)

References

External links

 

Malaysian motorcycle racers
125cc World Championship riders
1991 births
Living people
Moto3 World Championship riders
Supersport World Championship riders
People from Selangor
Moto2 World Championship riders